Giloti is a town and union council in the Dera Ismail Khan District of Khyber-Pakhtunkhwa. It is located at 32°9'53N 70°45'2E and has an altitude of 180 metres (590 feet).

Nearby areas
Giloti town is 16 km away from Darra Pezu & 8 km from Wanda Chunda. Other nearby  areas are Paniala, Yarik, Mehrabi and Wanda Jandar.

Well Known Tribes of Giloti
Kundi, Behram khel, Peer khel, Malik, Sheikh, Malakhel,  Musyani, Muthikhel,  Sarrang are the well known subtribes living in Giloti. Which are Pashtuns.

Agriculture Type

This village falls in Arid zone. Soil is mostly sandy and sandy loam. Winter crops include Wheat and Gram while at the onset of Monsoon Sorghum, Millet and Guar are cultivated. Mountain rainy streams (Rodh kohi) from Sheikh Badin Hills irrigate village farms during Monsoon season.

Famous Personalities
The few famous personalities are 
Late Molana Guldin, Late Malik Aman Ullah, Late Haji Nusrat Kundi, Mulana Shamsul Haq, Haji Ghulam Rasool, Saif Ullah Marwat (Ex-Director General Khyber Pakhtunkhwa Agriculture Extension), Colonel (Rtd.) Sultan Muhammad, Late Haji Rehmat Ullah (Ex-Inspector Islamabad Police/Councillor UC-35 Islamabad), Haji Imam Din (famous Falcon Trader and Businessman), Late Haji Gulab Din, Late Karar Kundi (Pashto Poet), Mufti Hafeez Ullah Sabri (Ex-Chairman UC Giloti), Malik Hameed Ullah (Chairman UC Giloti), Late Sher Din (Marwat folk singer and Poet).

Culture

This village inhabitants speaks Marwat dialct Pashto. Male wear shalwar-kazeez with turban (lungi) on head and a white cotton Chadar on a shoulder.  As kundi tribe traces back to Tank while Behram Khel, Peer Khel, Mussian, Sarang, Mayar, Jan Khel are also radiated from Lakki Marwat. Wedding, funeral and other celerations are similar to Marwats.

References

Union councils of Dera Ismail Khan District
Populated places in Dera Ismail Khan District